The foot-poundal (symbol: ft-pdl) is a unit of energy, introduced in 1879, that is part of the Absolute English system of units, which itself is a coherent subsystem of the foot–pound–second system.

The foot-poundal is equal to 1/32.174049 that of the more commonly used foot-pound force.

Conversions 
1 foot-poundal is equivalent to:
 0.031081 ft•lbf
 0.0421401100938048 J (exactly)
 421401.100938048  erg (exactly)
 0.0004 BTUIT
 0.010065 calIT or 0.000 010 65 "food calorie" (kcal or Cal)
 0.37297 inch-pound force (in•lbf)
 5.96752 inch-ounce force (in•ozf)

See also
Poundal
Foot-pound force
Pound-force
Slug (unit)
Units of energy

Footnotes

Units of energy
Units of torque
Imperial units